Matidia flagellifera is a species of spider of the genus Matidia. It is endemic to Sri Lanka.

See also 
 List of Clubionidae species

References

Endemic fauna of Sri Lanka
Clubionidae
Spiders of Asia
Spiders described in 1897